Mathewsoconcha belli is a species  of air-breathing land snails or semislugs, terrestrial pulmonate gastropod mollusks in the family Helicarionidae. This species is endemic to Norfolk Island.

References

Gastropods of Norfolk Island
Mathewsoconcha
Endangered fauna of Australia
Gastropods described in 1913
Taxonomy articles created by Polbot